This is the first edition of the tournament, primarily organised due to the cancellation of many tournaments in 2020, due to the COVID-19 pandemic.

Raven Klaasen and Ben McLachlan won the title, defeating Kevin Krawietz and Andreas Mies in the final, 6–2, 6–4.

Seeds

Draw

Draw

References
Main Draw

Bett1Hulks Championship - Doubles